Triple Threat is the debut album by jazz multi-instrumentalist Roland Kirk originally released on the King label in July 1957, later re-released on the Bethlehem label as Third Dimension and on the Affinity label as Early Roots. The original album received limited distribution and only became widely known after it was rereleased a few years prior to Kirk's death. It features performances by Kirk with James Madison, Carl Pruitt and Henry Duncan. The album features the first recorded examples of Kirk's trademark playing of multiple wind instruments at the same time as well as two tracks ("Stormy Weather" and "The Nearness of You") where he overdubbed manzello and tenor saxophone. Kirk would later state that the album "was about the third overdub record in black classical music".

Track listing
All compositions by Roland Kirk except where noted.
"Roland's Theme" - 2:51
"Slow Groove" - 6:52
"Stormy Weather" (Harold Arlen, Ted Koehler) - 4:38
"The Nearness of You" (Hoagy Carmichael, Ned Washington) - 5:34
"A La Carte" - 2:22
"Easy Living" (Ralph Rainger, Leo Robin) - 4:40
"Triple Threat" - 2:29
Recorded in New York City on November 9, 1956

Personnel
Roland Kirk: tenor saxophone, manzello, flute, stritch
James Madison: piano
Carl Pruitt: bass
Henry Duncan: drums

References

1957 albums
Rahsaan Roland Kirk albums
King Records (United States) albums
Bethlehem Records albums